Prudius is a Lithuanian surname commonly found in Ukraine as descendants of lytvyns. It may refer to:

Oleg Prudius (born 1979), Ukrainian professional wrestler
Vladyslav Prudius, retired Ukrainian professional footballer

Lithuanian-language surnames